A financial forecast is an estimate of future financial outcomes for a company or project, usually applied in budgeting, capital budgeting and / or valuation; see .    
Depending on context the term may also refer to listed company (quarterly) earnings guidance.
For a country or economy, see Economic forecast.

Typically, using historical internal accounting and sales data, in addition to external industry data and economic indicators, a financial forecast will be the analyst's modeled prediction of company outcomes in financial terms over a given time period.   
(For fundamental analysis, analysts often also use stock market information, such as the 52-week high of stock prices to augment their analysis of stock prices. )  
For the components / steps of business modeling here, see . 

Arguably, the key aspect of preparing a financial forecast is predicting revenue; 
future costs, fixed and variable, as well as capital, can then be estimated as a function of sales via "common-sized analysis" - where relationships are derived from historical financial ratios and other accounting relationships. 
At the same time, the resultant line items must talk to the business' operations:- in general, growth in revenue will require corresponding increases in working capital, fixed assets and associated financing; and in the long term, profitability (and other financial ratios) should tend to the industry average; 
see  for more detailed discussion, and other considerations; also Cash flow forecasting.

There is an extensive literature on the accuracy of analyst forecasts of revenue, profit and share price developments of companies. In general, this literature shows that analysts do not produce better forecasts than simple forecasting models

References 

Budgets
Forecasting
Corporate finance
Management accounting